George Lasher House, also known as Rainbow Hill, is a historic home located at Duanesburg in Schenectady County, New York. It was built about 1800 and is a two-story, five-bay frame building with a gable roof in the Federal style. Its front facade features a tripartite Palladian window.  Also on the property are four contributing barns, a carriage barn, four sheds, and a garage.

The property was covered in a 1984 study of Duanesburg historical resources.
It was listed on the National Register of Historic Places in 1984.

References

Houses on the National Register of Historic Places in New York (state)
Houses in Schenectady County, New York
Federal architecture in New York (state)
Houses completed in 1800
National Register of Historic Places in Schenectady County, New York